Umba Valley is a geographic area in Tanzania and the world's only source of Umba sapphires. 

The Umba River flows through the Umba Valley.

See also 
 Geography of Tanzania

References

Mindat listing

Valleys of Tanzania